Henry Dedrich "Harry" Lampe (14 September 1874 – 25 August 1939) was an Australian rules footballer who played with the South Melbourne Football Club in the Victorian Football League (VFL).  Originally from Wagga Wagga, he was considered one of the best Australian rules footballers from New South Wales.

Football
Lampe started out as a forward and kicked two of South Melbourne's three goals in their 1899 VFL Grand Final loss to Fitzroy. During the next two seasons he was his club's main attacking weapon and topped their goal-kicking with 16 goals in 1900 and 20 goals in 1901. He finished his career as a defender with his last game coming in the Swans 1907 VFL Grand Final loss to Carlton.

In 1909, Lampe worked as a VFL boundary umpire for six games and appeared once as a field umpire. He later moved back to Wagga Wagga and continued to play football until the age of 52. It was claimed that he played matches for 36 consecutive years. After finally retiring from football, Lampe played bowls.

His son Bill also played football and represented New South Wales in first-class cricket.

Notes

References
 South Melbourne Team, Melbourne Punch, (Thursday, 4 June 1903), p. 16.

External links

1874 births
1939 deaths
Sportspeople from Wagga Wagga
Australian rules footballers from New South Wales
Australian Rules footballers: place kick exponents
Sydney Swans players
Australian Football League umpires